Municipality of District 10 (Persian:منطقه ۱۰,also romanized as Mantaqe ye Dah) is one of 22 central districts of Tehran County in Tehran Province, Iran. The district 5 has most-populated district, which is center of city of Tehran. At the 1395 SH (2016 Gregorian calendar) census, its population was 327,000.

History 
District 10 of Tehran Municipality with its current structure was established on July 15, 1985.

Geography 
Municipality of District 10 has 3 regions and 10 quarters.

List of quarters 

 Berjanak (Persian:بریانک)
 Haft Čenar (Persian:هفت چنار) 
 Salsabil (Persian:سلسبیل)
 Zanjān (Persian:زنجان)

List of metro station 

 Shahid Navvab-e Safavi Metro Station
 Roudaki Metro Station
 Komeyl Metro Station
 Beryanak Metro Station

References 

Tehran County
Tehran-related lists